Augustus Baldwin may refer to:

Augustus C. Baldwin (1817–1903), U.S. Representative from Michigan
Augustus Warren Baldwin (1776–1866), naval officer and political figure in Upper Canada

See also
Augustus Baldwin Longstreet (1790–1870), American lawyer and humorist